Mirco Bertolina (born 11 May 1991) is an Italian cross-country skier. He competed in the 2018 Winter Olympics.

Cross-country skiing results
All results are sourced from the International Ski Federation (FIS).

Olympic Games

World Championships

World Cup

Season standings

References

External links

1991 births
Living people
Cross-country skiers at the 2018 Winter Olympics
Italian male cross-country skiers
Tour de Ski skiers
Olympic cross-country skiers of Italy
People from Sondalo
Cross-country skiers of Centro Sportivo Carabinieri
Sportspeople from the Province of Sondrio